The 2023 Women's EuroHockey Championship will be the sixteenth edition of the Women's EuroHockey Championship, the biennial international women's field hockey championship of Europe organised by the European Hockey Federation.

The tournament will be held alongside the men's tournament from 18 to 26 August 2023 at the Hockeypark, in Mönchengladbach, Germany. The winner will qualify for the 2024 Summer Olympics.

Qualification

Along with the host nation Germany, the top three teams at the 2021 EuroHockey Championship and the four winners of the 2022 EuroHockey Championship Qualifiers will field the women's tournament.

Preliminary round
All times are local (UTC+2).

Pool A

Pool B

Fifth to eighth place classification
The points obtained in the preliminary round against the other team will be carried over.

First to fourth place classification

Semi-finals

Third and fourth place

Final

Final standings

See also
2023 Men's EuroHockey Championship

References

External links

 
Women's EuroHockey Nations Championship
Women 1
EuroHockey Championship
International women's field hockey competitions hosted by Germany
EuroHockey Championship
Sport in Mönchengladbach
EuroHockey Championship
21st century in Mönchengladbach
Field hockey at the Summer Olympics – Women's European qualification
EuroHockey Championship